This is a list of notable Greek architects in alphabetical order:

Modern Greece

A–Z

Nikolaos Balanos
Kostas Biris
Ioannis Despotopoulos
Constantinos Apostolou Doxiadis
Patroklos Karantinos
Stamatios Kleanthis
Aris Konstantinidis
Anastasios Metaxas
Anastasios Orlandos
Xenophon Paionidis
Dimitris Pikionis
Pericles A. Sakellarios
Alexandros Tombazis
Stamatis Voulgaris
Elia Zenghelis

See also

 List of architects
 List of Greeks 

Greek
Architects